Ruslan Valeryevich Pimenov (born 25 November 1981) is a Russian former football player.

Career
He played mostly for Lokomotiv Moscow and then briefly for Alania Vladikavkaz. In 2005–2006 he played for FC Metz in France. In 2007, he transferred to Dynamo Moscow. However, Andrei Kobelev soon forbade Pimenov even to train with the team as the footballer lacked for fitness. Pimenov was released from his contract only in December 2009.

He played four matches for Russia in 2002, including two at the 2002 FIFA World Cup.

Honours
 Russian Premier League champion in 2002 and 2004
 Russian Cup winner in 2000 and 2001
 Russian Super Cup winner in 2003

Personal life
Ruslan was married to Glikeriya Shirokova. They first met at Lokomotiv Moscow where Glikeriya was working as a staff member. They have one daughter together, Kristina Pimenova, who is a well-known child model. Kristina has an older half-sister, Natalia, Glikeriya's eldest child.

References

External links
 Player profile 
 

1981 births
Footballers from Moscow
Living people
Russian footballers
Association football forwards
Russia under-21 international footballers
Russia international footballers
2002 FIFA World Cup players
Russian Premier League players
Ligue 1 players
Russian expatriate footballers
Expatriate footballers in France
Expatriate footballers in Belarus
FC Moscow players
FC Lokomotiv Moscow players
FC Spartak Vladikavkaz players
FC Metz players
FC Dynamo Moscow players
FC Dinamo Minsk players